Itamarati is a municipality located in the Brazilian state of Amazonas. Its population was 7,814 (2020) and its area is 25,276 km².

References

Municipalities in Amazonas (Brazilian state)